Thamserku is a mountain in the Himalayas of eastern Nepal. The mountain is connected by a ridge leading eastward to Kangtega. Thamserku is a prominent mountain to the east of Namche Bazaar and lies just north of Kusum Kangguru.

The first ascent was made in 1964 from the south by members of Edmund Hillary's Schoolhouse Expedition: Lynn Crawford, Pete Farrell, John McKinnon and Richard Stewart. Below the basin on the southwest face, they reached the south ridge after climbing a difficult couloir. The team described the climb as difficult and the route has not been repeated in its entirety by anyone else. In 2014, Russian climbers Alexander Gukov and Alexey Lonchinskiy made the first ascent on the southwest face.

References

External links
 

Mountains of Koshi Province
Six-thousanders of the Himalayas